Thomas Cook Group Airlines Limited was an airline holding company of the defunct British Thomas Cook Group. The airlines operated as a single operating segment of the Thomas Cook Group to allow aircraft to be used when and where they were needed. There were five members of the airline division at the time of the airline's closing, consisting of Condor, Thomas Cook Airlines, Thomas Cook Airlines Balearics, Thomas Cook Airlines Scandinavia, and Thomas Cook Aviation. The airline operated with a total of 105 aircraft based in the United Kingdom, Denmark and Germany.

History 
In 2013 the CEO of Thomas Cook Group, Harriet Green, merged the British Thomas Cook Airlines, Danish Thomas Cook Airlines Scandinavia, German Condor, and the now-defunct Thomas Cook Airlines Belgium into one single operating segment, after the closing of Thomas Cook Airlines Canada.

The United Kingdom's Civil Aviation Authority announced on 23 September 2019 that the group had gone into liquidation. While the British subsidiary Thomas Cook Airlines ceased operations immediately, all the other remaining airline branches continued to operate. 

Thomas Cook Airlines Scandinavia was bought by separate investors and rebranded on 1 November 2019 as Sunclass Airlines, Thomas Cook Airlines Balearics ceased all operations on 26 December 2019, and also Thomas Cook Aviation on 2 April 2020. As of April 2020, only Condor continues to operate.

Airlines 
The following airlines were part of, or previously part of the division until its demise in September 2019. Airlines that remained active past the demise continued operations separately from the division.

Fleet 

As of September 2019, the collective fleet of Thomas Cook Group Airlines Limited and its members included the following aircraft:

References

Airline holding companies
British companies established in 2013
British companies disestablished in 2019